Catherine Ann Podewell (born January 27, 1964) is an American actress known for playing the role of Cally Harper Ewing on Dallas from 1988 to 1991, 2013.

Early life and education 
Podewell was born in Evanston, Illinois.  She moved to Walnut Creek, California and was raised there by her father, a teacher, and her mother, a real estate agent. Her paternal grandparents, Lester Podewell and Beverly Younger, were also actors. She attended the University of California, Santa Barbara where she studied theater arts and dancing.

Career 
Podewell is best known for playing Cally Harper Ewing, the second wife of the character J.R. Ewing, on Dallas from 1988 to 1991.  Podewell also appeared in the 1988 horror film Night of the Demons and the 1989 comedy film Beverly Hills Brats.  She also had guest appearances on television series, including Valerie, Murder, She Wrote, Beverly Hills, 90210, Paradise, Walker, Texas Ranger and Growing Pains. 

In 2013, Podewell reprised her role as Cally Harper for J.R. Ewing's funeral episode in the second season of the new Dallas. She made her film return in 2020, with starring role in the horror film Reunion from Hell, making her return to the horror genre after a 30-year absence.

Personal life 
Podewell married Steven Glueck in May 1989. They have three children. She took time from acting from 1995 to 2013 to focus on motherhood.

Filmography

Award nomination
 1991: Nomination – Soap Opera Digest Award for Outstanding Lead Actress: Prime Time

References

External links 
 

1964 births
Living people
American soap opera actresses
American television actresses
Actresses from Evanston, Illinois
University of California, Santa Barbara alumni
21st-century American women